KKUT (93.7 FM) is a radio station licensed to serve Mount Pleasant, Utah and serving the Provo metropolitan area. The station is owned by Mid-Utah Radio and licensed to Sanpete County Broadcasting Co. The format is known as 93.7 The Wolf.

The station has been assigned these call letters by the Federal Communications Commission since March 1, 2016.

The current KKUT signed on October 1, 2013 using the nickname 'Sky FM', and has aired a hot adult contemporary format.

History
The station was previously known as KKWZ, beginning on January 26, 1981. On April 18, 1997, the station changed its call sign to KCYQ, on August 8, 2005 to KLGL, on November 9, 2012 to KUTC, and on March 1, 2016 to the current KKUT.

Originally licensed to serve Richfield, Utah, the station was licensed to serve Mount Pleasant on August 21, 2013.

On September 19, 2016 KKUT changed their format from hot adult contemporary to country, branded as "93.7 The Wolf".

KKUT broadcasts in HD Radio.

References

External links

KUT
Country radio stations in the United States
Radio stations established in 1981
1981 establishments in Utah